Hemanta Dora (born 4 December 1973) is a former Indian International football player who played as a goalkeeper. Dora has played for Mohun Bagan and won the 1997-98 National Football League. He played for India national team including the Nehru Cup in 1997 and the 1998 Bangkok Asian Games.

Honours

India
SAFF Championship: 1993
 South Asian Games Gold medal: 1995

East Bengal
Federation Cup: 1996

Mohun Bagan
National Football League: 1997–98

References

Indian footballers
India international footballers
1973 births
Living people
Footballers from West Bengal
East Bengal Club players
Mohun Bagan AC players
Association football goalkeepers
Footballers at the 1998 Asian Games
Asian Games competitors for India
South Asian Games medalists in football
South Asian Games gold medalists for India